Saffell is an unincorporated community in Lawrence County, Arkansas, United States. Saffell has a post office with ZIP code 72572.

Education
It is within the Hillcrest School District.

It was formerly in the Strawberry School District. On July 1, 1992, that district merged into the River Valley School District, which then merged into Hillcrest on July 1, 2004.

References

Unincorporated communities in Lawrence County, Arkansas
Unincorporated communities in Arkansas